Lorenzo Campins y Ballester (1726 in Palma de Mallorca – February 20, 1785 in Caracas) was a Spanish born physician considered to be the founder of the formal studies of modern medicine in Venezuela. He studied medicine at the Real y Pontificia Universidad de Gandía (1755). He served as a physician until 1761 when he travelled to Caracas to serve as a faculty member in the Real y Pontificia Universidad de Caracas.

1726 births
1785 deaths
People from Palma de Mallorca
Academic staff of the Central University of Venezuela
University of Valencia alumni
19th-century Spanish physicians
Viceroyalty of New Granada people